Markku Kyllönen (born February 15, 1962) is a retired professional ice hockey player who played in the National Hockey League and SM-liiga. He played for Kärpät, SaiPa, and Winnipeg Jets. After spending several years in Finland, Kyllönen moved to North America in 1988, playing nine games for Winnipeg while mainly playing for their American Hockey League affiliate. He returned to Europe the following season, and spent the rest of his career playing in different leagues, retiring in 2000. Internationally Kyllönen played for Finland at the 1987 Canada Cup.

Career statistics

Regular season and playoffs

International

External links 

1962 births
Living people
EV Landsberg players
Finnish ice hockey left wingers
Jokipojat players
Moncton Hawks players
Odense Bulldogs players
Oulun Kärpät players
People from Joensuu
SaiPa players
Winnipeg Jets (1979–1996) draft picks
Winnipeg Jets (1979–1996) players
Sportspeople from North Karelia